The Cape Higuer is a cape on the Bay of Biscay standing out at the end of the mountain range Jaizkibel by the France–Spain border in the municipality of Hondarribia ( away from the town centre). The site is home to a lighthouse, besides holding a camp-site and a couple of inns. It is sometimes considered the westernmost land strip of the Pyrenees, with the trek trail GR 11 setting out at this point.

A wreck lies on the bed of the water, arguably a Roman one, with mineral load and remnants of timber alongside ceramics items in it. This is the third Roman archaeological site uncovered in the area of the Lower Bidasoa, which bears witness to the ancient Basque Roman town Oiasso.

See also 

 Linea P (Spain)

References

Further reading 
 Roman findings in the Lower Bidasoa 

Gipuzkoa
Higuer